Akbarabad (also Romanized as Akbarābād) is a village in Vahdat Rural District, in the Central District of Zarand County, Kerman Province, Iran. At the 2006 census, its population was 53, in 13 families.

References 

Populated places in Zarand County